Hainina is an extinct mammal genus from the latest Cretaceous to the Paleocene of Europe.

Genus 
The genus Hainina ("from Hainin") was named by Vianey-Liaud M. in 1979. This genus was originally referred to as Cimolomyidae. "We assign Hainina to the Kogaionidae (superfamily incertae sedis); it differs from Kogaionon in having ornamented enamel, while the enamel is smooth in Kogaionon". Material has also been reported from the Upper Cretaceous of Romania.

Species 
Fossils have been described as and found in:
 Species: Hainina belgica Vianey-Liaud M., 1979
 Place: Paleocene Hainin Formation of Hainin, Belgium
 Species: Hainina godfriauxi Vianey-Liaud M., 1979
 Place: Paleocene of Hainin, Belgium
 Species: Hainina pyrenaica Peláez-Campomanes P., Damms R., López-Martinen N. & Àlvarez-Sierra M. A., 2000
 Place: Early Paleocene Tremp Formation, in the southern Pyrenees of Spain
 Species: Hainina vianeyae Peláez-Campomanes P., Damms R., López-Martinen N. & Àlvarez-Sierra M. A., 2000
 Place: Late Paleocene Cernay Formation of Cernay, France
 Hainina sp. - Densus-Ciula Formation, Maastrichtian and Jibou Formation, Thanetian, Romania

References

Bibliography 
 Vianey-Liaud (1979), "Les Mammifères montiens de Hainin (Paléocène moyen de Belgique). Part I. Multituberculés". Paleovertebrata 9, pp. 117–131.

Further reading 
 Peláez-Campomanes et al. (2000), "The earliest mammal of the European Paleocene: the multituberculate Hainina". J of Paleont 74(4), pp. 701–711.
 Kielan-Jaworowska Z. & Hurum J. H. (2001), "Phylogeny and Systematics of multituberculate mammals". Paleontology 44, pp. 389–429.
 Much of this information has been derived from Dead link MESOZOIC MAMMALS; "basal" Cimolodonta, Cimolomyidae, Boffiidae and Kogaionidae, an Internet directory.

Cimolodonts
Maastrichtian genus first appearances
Paleocene genus extinctions
Cretaceous–Paleogene boundary
Cretaceous mammals of Europe
Cretaceous Romania
Fossils of Romania
Paleocene mammals of Europe
Paleogene Belgium
Fossils of Belgium
Paleogene France
Fossils of France
Paleogene Spain
Fossils of Spain
Tremp Formation
Fossil taxa described in 1979
Prehistoric mammal genera